Paulus Hisage (born on November 27, 1994) is an Indonesian footballer that currently plays for Perseru Serui in the Indonesia Soccer Championship.

References

External links
Paulus Hisage at Liga Indonesia

1994 births
Living people
Indonesian footballers
Indonesian Premier Division players
Liga 1 (Indonesia) players
Persiwa Wamena players
Association football forwards
Association football midfielders